Word play or wordplay (also: play-on-words) is a literary technique and a form of wit in which words used become the main subject of the work, primarily for the purpose of intended effect or amusement. Examples of word play include puns, phonetic mix-ups such as spoonerisms, obscure words and meanings, clever rhetorical excursions, oddly formed sentences, double entendres, and telling character names (such as in the play The Importance of Being Earnest, Ernest being a given name that sounds exactly like the adjective earnest).

Word play is quite common in oral cultures as a method of reinforcing meaning. Examples of text-based (orthographic) word play are found in languages with or without alphabet-based scripts, such as homophonic puns in Mandarin Chinese.

Techniques 

Some techniques often used in word play include interpreting idioms literally and creating contradictions and redundancies, as in Tom Swifties:
"Hurry up and get to the back of the ship," Tom said sternly.

Linguistic fossils and set phrases are often manipulated for word play, as in Wellerisms:
"We'll have to rehearse that," said the undertaker as the coffin fell out of the car.
Another use of fossils is in using antonyms of unpaired words – "I was well-coiffed and sheveled," (back-formation from "disheveled").

Examples 

Most writers engage in word play to some extent, but certain writers are particularly committed to, or adept at, word play as a major feature of their work . Shakespeare's "quibbles" have made him a noted punster. Similarly, P.G. Wodehouse was hailed by The Times as a "comic genius recognized in his lifetime as a classic and an old master of farce" for his own acclaimed wordplay. James Joyce, author of Ulysses, is another noted word-player. For example, in his Finnegans Wake Joyce's phrase "they were yung and easily freudened" clearly implies the more conventional "they were young and easily frightened"; however, the former also makes an apt pun on the names of two famous psychoanalysts, Jung and Freud.

An epitaph, probably unassigned to any grave, demonstrates use in rhyme.
Here lie the bones of one 'Bun'
He was killed with a gun.
His name was not 'Bun' but 'Wood'
But 'Wood' would not rhyme with gun
But 'Bun' would.

Crossword puzzles often employ wordplay to challenge solvers. Cryptic crosswords especially are based on elaborate systems of wordplay.

An example of modern word play can be found on line 103 of Childish Gambino's "III. Life: The Biggest Troll".H2O plus my D, that's my hood, I'm living in it

Rapper Milo uses a play on words in his verse on "True Nen"

Keep any heat by the fine China dinner set
Your man's caught the chill and it ain't even winter yet

A farmer says, "I got soaked for nothing, stood out there in the rain bang in the middle of my land, a complete waste of time. I'll like to kill the swine who said you can win the Nobel Prize for being out standing in your field!".

Eminem is known for the extensive wordplay in the lyrics of his music.

The Mario Party series is known for its mini-game titles that usually are puns and various plays on words; for example: "Shock, Drop, and Roll", "Gimme a Brake", and "Right Oar Left". These mini-game titles are also different depending on regional differences and take into account that specific region's culture.

Related phenomena 
Word play can enter common usage as neologisms.

Word play is closely related to word games; that is, games in which the point is manipulating words. See also language game for a linguist's variation.

Word play can cause problems for translators: e.g. in the book Winnie-the-Pooh a character mistakes the word "issue" for the noise of a sneeze, a resemblance which disappears when the word "issue" is translated into another language.

See also
 Etymology
 False etymology
 Figure of speech
 List of forms of word play
 List of taxa named by anagrams
 Metaphor
 Phono-semantic matching
 Simile
 Pun

References

External links

 A categorized taxonomy of word play composed of record-holding words

 
Rhetoric
Word games
Comedy genres